Ocaria is a Neotropical genus of butterflies in the family Lycaenidae.

Species
Ocaria clenchi (Johnson, 1992)
Ocaria aholiba (Hewitson, 1867)
Ocaria clepsydra (Druce, 1907)
Ocaria arpoxais (Godman & Salvin, [1887])
Ocaria cinerea (Lathy, 1936)
Ocaria sadiei (Weeks, 1901)
Ocaria petelina (Hewitson, 1877)
Ocaria elvira (Johnson, 1992)
Ocaria calesia (Hewitson, 1870)
Ocaria elongata (Hewitson, 1870)
Ocaria thales (Fabricius, 1793)
Ocaria arcula (Druce, 1907)
Ocaria ocrisia (Hewitson, 1868)

References

External links
Butterflies of the Americas Images
Butterflies of the Americas Ocaria aholiba type specimens

Eumaeini
Lycaenidae of South America
Lycaenidae genera
Taxa named by William J. Clench